Giovanni Aldobrandini (1525 – 7 September 1573) was an Italian Roman Catholic bishop and cardinal.

A member of the Aldobrandini family, Giovanni Aldobrandini was born in Fano in 1525, the son of Salvestro Aldobrandini, governor of Fano, and Lisa Donati. His younger brother, Ippolito Aldobrandini (1536–1605), became Pope Clement VIII in 1592. He was the uncle of Cardinals Pietro Aldobrandini and Cinzio Passeri Aldobrandini.

He was educated at the University of Ferrara, becoming a doctor of both laws on February 9, 1545.

From September 1551 until August 1552, he was governor of Rimini. He was a consistorial lawyer from 1554 to 1556. In 1556, he became an auditor of the Roman Rota.

Ecclesiastically, he was a cleric of Florence and Chaplain of His Holiness. On August 26, 1569, he was elected Bishop of Imola. He was consecrated as a bishop in capella domus suæ solitæ habitationis by Scipione Rebiba, Archbishop of Pisa, on December 8, 1569 with Giulio Antonio Santorio, Archbishop of Santa Severina, and Felice Peretti Montalto, Bishop of Sant'Agata de' Goti, serving as co-consecrators. He resigned the government of his see sometime before February 9, 1573.

Pope Pius V made him a cardinal priest in the consistory of May 17, 1570. He received the red hat and the titular church of Sant'Euphemia. On November 20, 1570, he opted for the titular church of San Simeone Profeta. The pope charged him with convincing Spain and the Republic of Venice to join a league against the Ottoman Empire or to contribute money to that cause. He participated in the papal conclave of 1572 that elected Pope Gregory XIII. He served as Grand Penitentiary from December 14, 1572 until his death. 

In 1573, he was Prefect of the Signature of Apostolic Briefs. He died in Rome on September 7, 1573. He was buried in the Aldobrandini Chapel of Santa Maria sopra Minerva.

References

1525 births
1573 deaths
16th-century Italian Roman Catholic bishops
Cardinals created by Pope Pius V
16th-century Italian cardinals